Iran International is a Persian language news television channel headquartered in Washington, D.C. aimed at Iranian viewers, and broadcasting free-to-air by satellite. Iran International was established in May 2017 in London but moved its headquarters to Washington, D.C. in February 2023 due to increased threats from the Iranian government against Iran International’s UK-based journalists. It is available online, via radio and via satellite broadcasting worldwide including Iran.

Iran International is owned by Volant Media UK Ltd. It is licensed in the United Kingdom to Global Media Circulating Ltd as an editorial news service based in London and is managed by DMA Media Ltd, which has bureaus in Paris, Istanbul, Kabul and Washington. Volant Media UK launched a sister channel in 2021, Afghanistan International.

The channel has received media attention for its reporting on human rights violations, separatism in Iran, political developments, LGBTQ+ rights and women's rights in Iran and has twice been nominated for International Channel of the Year by the Association for International Broadcasting. It is also known that the channel has ties with the Saudi Arabian royal family, with some funding for the channel coming from people closely associated with the same, such that the Iranian government has specified the tethering of Iran International's activities as a prerequesite for normalization of its disturbed diplomatic relations with the Saudi administration. Iran International’s management do not deny that they receive funding by Saudi nationals but they do deny that they are linked to any government, including that of Saudi Arabia.

In 2022, an independent survey carried out by the Group for Analyzing and Measuring Attitudes in Iran (GAMAAN) and reported by the AIB found that Iran International is the most influential source of independent news in Iran with 33% of the daily audience. More than half of the 27,000 participants surveyed also reported that they trusted Iran International "a lot" or "to some extent". During the Mahsa Amini protests on 9 November 2022, the Iranian Minister of Intelligence Ismail Khatib announced that Iran International had been declared a terrorist organization by the Islamic Republic of Iran, accused by the government of inciting riots protesting the regime. News sources have reported that the Iranian government is waging an "intimidation campaign" against personnel of the TV station, freezing their assets, interrogating their relatives and "threatening to snatch them from British streets if they do not quit their jobs".

History and availability
Iran International was launched on 18 May 2017, with the aim of serving the 80 million people that live in Iran and the Iranian diaspora around the world, in addition to informing and educating a global audience on the latest news and developments in Iran and across the Middle East.

The channel is headquartered in London and broadcasts internationally, with a team of journalists that have joined Iran International from other Persian-language news channels including Manoto, Radio Farda, BBC Persian Service and Voice of America. It has bureaus in Istanbul, Paris and Washington D.C.

Iran International broadcasts via the TürkmenÄlem 52°E / MonacoSAT satellite to a wide region of Europe and Asia (including Iran), and also transmits an audio relay of it receivable in Iran via shortwave radio (SW). It also broadcasts worldwide via online streaming through its website or streaming apps.

Programming

According to Middle East Eye, Iran International is a media platform for the Iranian opposition. Kourosh Ziabari of Al-Monitor wrote it "does not shy away from presenting itself as an opposition media organization" and frequently gives the microphone to guests who criticize the Iranian government. The channel has been referred to as an "Iranian exile news outlet" by Borzou Daragahi of The Independent.

The channel is known for raising the profile of Reza Pahlavi, the last heir apparent to the former Iranian throne, by constant coverage and repeatedly interviewing him. It also airs coverage of People's Mujahedin of Iran (MEK), including live broadcast of their rallies.

The claim of responsibility for the Ahvaz military parade attack was made through Iran International. In 2020, the TV broadcast performance of Iranian singers who were flown in from the United States to the Winter at Tantora Festival. Iran International does not run television advertisements.

News output
Iran International relies on a team of journalists around the world and reports on current affairs, health, technology, human rights violations, LGBTQ+ rights, women's rights and more. The channel has reported extensively on the COVID-19 pandemic in Iran, the Iran Nuclear Deal and global politics.

The channel also airs television shows on sport, culture and politics and has produced documentaries that have been nominated for awards by the Association for International Broadcasters.

Exclusive stories
The channel has been the first to report on several exclusive news stories and has access to a network of whistleblowers and sources inside Iran.

Iran International reported exclusively on the extension of Nazanin Zaghari-Ratcliffe's furlough, and her partner Richard Ratcliffe has been a guest on the channel multiple times. The channel was also the first to report that Iranian rapper Amir Tataloo was facing deportation back to Iran from Turkey, and the sentencing of The Salesman star Taraneh Alidoosti.

During the Covid-19 pandemic in Iran, the channel published exclusive documents pertaining to high level government corruption concerning Covid-19 medical supplies, with The Independent writing that the documents "purported to show how Iran regime figures intervened in the procurement of medical supplies to steer South Korean contracts for Covid-19 test-kits through shell companies towards conservative foundations controlled by cronies".

Reporting on the execution of Navid Afkari, Iran International exclusively interviewed Amnesty International’s Iran Researcher and human rights lawyer Raha Bahreini, who told the channel that “with the secret and previously unannounced execution of Navid Afkari, the Islamic Republic authorities once again showed the ruthless and merciless of Iran’s judiciary system at the international level,”.

Zarifgate 
On 25 April 2021, Iran International obtained a leaked audio file of Iran's Foreign Minister, Mohammad Javad Zarif criticising the Islamic Revolutionary Guards Corps, and claiming that the deceased commander of the Quds Force, Qasem Soleimani had taken Iran into the Syrian Civil War because Russian President Vladimir Putin wanted Iranian forces on the ground to complement the Russian air campaign in support of the Syrian Government.

Zarif also mentioned that Russia had wanted to stop the Joint Comprehensive Plan of Action and keep Iran at odds with the West.

Elements of the recording also prompted US Republicans to call for the resignation of John Kerry from US President Joe Biden's National Security Council after Zarif revealed during the recording that Kerry had informed him of Israeli operations in Syria.

Human rights
Lesbian activist and journalist at Iran International, Aram Bolandpaz has produced several documentaries on the LGBTQ+ community inside Iran and has been a vocal critic of human rights violations against the community.

In June 2020, Iran International reported on a series of honour killings and gender-based violence that took place in Iran, with legal analyst and journalist at Iran International Nargess Tavalossian, the daughter of Nobel Prize winning activist Shirin Ebadi, speaking publicly to global media outlets about the increase in violence against women in the country.

The channel has also been noted for its reporting on the arrest of award-winning film director Mohammed Rouslouf.

Staff
The head of TV is Mahmood Enayat, and the Director of News is Aliasghar Ramezanpour, who was the deputy Minister of Culture of Iran under former president Mohammad Khatami.

In July 2019, Iranian media reporter Mazdak Mirzaei, a football commentator and TV host joined Iran International. Mirzaei had worked for IRIB on the weekly TV sports program Navad, that was suspended by the new head of IRIB 3 in March 2019.

In May 2020, Iran International senior journalist Omid Habibinia joined the team.
In September 2021, Iran International journalist Tajuden Soroush published several reports on Afghanistan following the 15 August 2021 Fall of Kabul.

Ownership
Iran International is owned by Volant Media UK Ltd. It is licensed in the United Kingdom to Global Media Circulating Ltd as an editorial news service based in London and is managed by DMA Media Ltd, which has bureaus in Paris, Istanbul, Kabul and Washington. Volant Media UK launched a sister channel in 2021, Afghanistan International.

Corporate documents for Volant Media shows that another Saudi national, Fahad Ibrahim Aldeghither, was the major shareholder of Volant Media before Adel Abdukarim. Aldeghither owned over 75% of the shares of Volant Media from May 2016 to May 2018. Fahad Ibrahim Aldeghither was the chairman of Mobile Telecommunication Company Saudi Arabia (Zain) from March 2013 to February 2016. Zain Saudi is the third-largest telecoms provider in Saudi Arabia.

Controversies and criticisms
Iran International's news and analysis has been cited in Western media publications including BBC News, The Guardian, The Sydney Morning Herald, The Telegraph, Fox News, and The Independent  Staff at Iran International have also appeared as experts on BBC Radio 4, Sky News, Australian Broadcasting Corporation networks and ITN.

Iranian complaint to Ofcom
In 2018 Iran's ambassador to the UK lodged a complaint to the media regulator because of Iran International's interview with a separatist group spokesman after they claimed responsibility for a terrorist attack on a military parade in Ahvaz in Khuzestan Province, killing 25 civilians and military. The channel aired an interview with Yaqoub Hor Altostari, presented as a spokesman for the group, indirectly claiming responsibility for the attack and calling it "resistance against legitimate targets". After a long investigation Ofcom ruled that Iran International did not breach any rules.

Alleged lack of editorial independence
Though the TV station states that it "adheres to strict international standards of impartiality, balance and accountability", questions has been raised regarding its editorial independence.

In October 2018, a report by Saeed Kamali Dehghan in The Guardian linked Iran International's funding to Saudi Prince Mohammed bin Salman. It also interviewed an unnamed insider who said that the editorial content had been influenced by its investors. A source was reported by the Guardian as saying that Iran International received $250m from Saudi Arabia for launching the channel. The insider and an unnamed ex-employee expressed dismay that Saudi funding had been concealed from the employees. Iran International denied The Guardian's report.

According to The Wall Street Journal, "[some] journalists at Iran International have complained that management is pushing a pro-Saudi, anti-Islamic Republic line". WSJ quoted a former correspondent at the TV station commenting that "a systematic and very persistent push" was made during her time there.

Azadeh Moaveni of New York University has charged the channel is an arm of Saudi Arabia: "I would not describe Iran International as pro-reform, or organically Iranian in any manner".

Union busting
Michelle Stanistreet, general secretary of National Union of Journalists (NUJ) told Press Gazette "[o]ur members at Iran International have faced intimidation and harassment for their work as journalists —that their rights of freedom of association should be trampled on in this way is a grave injustice and one that the NUJ will do all it can to rectify".

On  10 July 2020, International Federation of Journalists (IFJ) released a statement and condemned union busting efforts made by Iran International, its refusal to engage with the UK government's non-departmental public body Acas to recognize a NUJ chapel, as well as what it called a "breach of international labour standards". Iran International had signed a recognition deal with the British Association of Journalists (BAJ), which IFJ describes as a "sweetheart deal" with an "obscure journalists' union", and appointed a senior manager to represent staff while pressuring them to join BAJ. NUJ stated that BAJ had no members there before the deal was made. As of July 2020, BAJ claimed 20 members working at Iran International while NUJ said an "overwhelming majority" of the 140 workers are its members.

On 15 July 2020, it was reported that Labour peer Lord John Hendy submitted a complaint to International Labour Organization (ILO) against the BAJ and Iran International.

Persecution of Iran International staff
In December 2019, Shanti Das of The Times reported that Iran is waging an "intimidation campaign" against personnel of the TV station, freezing their assets, interrogating their relatives and "threatening to snatch them from British streets if they do not quit their jobs". Iran's Ministry of Intelligence had previously named the employees of Iran International as "enemy of the state", writing on its website that those who "serve foreigners" and "betray the country" will be punished. The same publication wrote in May 2020 that Iran International is thought to be target of a state-sponsored programme that "has sought to discredit its reporting and trace its followers" by creating replicas of its social media accounts. Instagram was criticized for hosting the fake accounts.

Designation as a terrorist organization by the Iranian government
On 9 November 2022, among the Mahsa Amini protests, the Iranian Minister of Intelligence Ismail Khatib announced that Iran International has been declared a terrorist organization by the Islamic Republic of Iran for supposedly inciting the anti-government riots. Any cooperation with the channel will be considered an act of cooperation with terrorists and a threat to national security.

Response to Iranian government
In response to Iranian government castigation, Iran International deemed it needed to increase security in order to protect its London staff from threats emanating from Tehran. These bulwarks have included concrete barriers “guaranteed to stop a 7.5 ton truck at 50 miles (80 kilometers) per hour,” taking the lead from the way the UK government uses such barriers to defend against vehicular onslaughts, which vehicles are now monitored through checkpoints.

Eventually, on February 18, 2023 , after a significant escalation in state-backed threats from Iran and advice from the Metropolitan Police, Iran International TV said it has reluctantly closed its London studios and moved broadcasting to Washington DC.

References

External links
  
 
 

Television channels and stations established in 2017
Television channels in the United Kingdom
Persian-language television stations
Chiswick
Organisations designated as terrorist by Iran